Poor Butterfly is a 1986 Argentine drama film directed by Raúl de la Torre. It was entered into the 1986 Cannes Film Festival.

Cast
 Graciela Borges as Clara
 Lautaro Murúa
 Pepe Soriano as Shloime
 Víctor Laplace as Jose
 Bibi Andersson as Gertrud
 Duilio Marzio
 Cipe Lincovsky as Juana
 Fernando Fernán Gómez
 Ana María Picchio as Irma
 China Zorrilla
 Cacho Fontana

References

External links

1986 films
1986 drama films
Films directed by Raúl de la Torre
Argentine drama films
1980s Spanish-language films
1980s Argentine films